Mitsuru (みつる, ミツル) is a unisex Japanese given name. Notable people with the name include:

Possible writings
, "full/fullness"
, "grow/raise"
, "light flow"

People with the name
, Japanese manga author
, Japanese professional football defender
, Japanese actor
, pen-name of a Japanese manga author
, Japanese actor
, Japanese film director
, Japanese botanist
, former keyboardist and songwriter
, Japanese animator
, Japanese actor for TV Asahi
, Japanese rower
, Japanese football player
, Japanese table tennis player
, Japanese football player
, Japanese cryptographer
, Japanese figure skater
, Japanese film director, screenwriter, and actor
, Japanese manga author
, Japanese voice actor
, Japanese football player
, Japanese artist and poet
, male voice actor from Aomori Prefecture affiliated with Mausu Promotion
, Japanese politician
, Japanese wrestler and Olympic champion
, Japanese manga author
, Japanese general who fought at the Battle of Okinawa during World War 2
, Japanese author and naval officer
, female Japanese novelist

Fictional characters
Mitsuru, character from the Fruit Baskets anime
Mitsuru Ihara, character from the Food Fight TV series
Mitsuru Kirijo, character from Persona 3
Mitsuru Numai, character from the Battle Royale anime.
Mitsuru Suou, character from the Crescent Moon manga
Mitsuru Tokieda, character from World Trigger manga

See also
 6091 Mitsuru, main-belt asteroid

Japanese unisex given names